Burkholderia virus phi52237 is a bacteriophage (a virus that infects bacteria) of the family Myoviridae, genus Tigrvirus.

References 

Myoviridae